The Kerala backwaters are a network of brackish lagoons and canals lying parallel to the Arabian Sea of the Malabar coast of Kerala state in south-western India. The network includes five large lakes linked by canals, both man made and natural, fed by 38 rivers, and extending virtually half the length of Kerala state. The backwaters were formed by the action of waves and shore currents creating low barrier islands across the mouths of the many rivers flowing down from the Western Ghats range. In the midst of this landscape there are a number of towns and cities, which serve as the starting and end points of backwater cruises. There are 34 backwaters in Kerala. Out of it, 27 are located either closer to Arabian Sea or parallel to the sea. The remaining 7 are inland navigation routes.

The backwaters have a unique ecosystem: freshwater from the rivers meets the seawater from the Arabian Sea. A barrage has been built near Thanneermukkom, so salt water from the sea is prevented from entering the deep inside, keeping the fresh water intact. Such fresh water is extensively used for irrigation purposes. Many unique species of aquatic life including crabs, frogs and mudskippers, water birds such as terns, kingfishers, darters and cormorants, and animals such as otters and turtles live in and alongside the backwaters. Palm trees, pandanus shrubs, various leafy plants, and bushes grow alongside the backwaters, providing a green hue to the surrounding landscape.

Hydrography
The lake has a large network of canals that meander through the region of Kuttanad. The important rivers from north to south are the Valapattanam , Chaliyar , Kadalundipuzha , Bharathappuzha , Chalakudy , Periyar , Pamba , Achankovil , Meenachil , and Kalladayar . Other than these, there are 35 more small rivers and rivulets flowing down from the Ghats. Most of these rivers are navigable up to the midland region, in country crafts. 

Vembanad Lake is the longest backwater in Kerala, as well as the longest lake in India. The Kochi city, Kuttanad, Kumarakom, and Pathiramanal Island are located in this long backwater. The Vellayani Lake, the Pookode Lake, and the Sasthamcotta Lake are the freshwater lakes in Kerala. Sasthamcotta is the largest among them. The Kerala backwaters host three of the world’s Ramsar Convention-listed wetlands: Ashtamudi Lake, Sasthamkotta Lake, and the Vembanad-Kol wetlands are noted as being wetlands of international importance.

Tourism

Houseboats 

Kettuvallam (Kerala houseboats) in the backwaters are one of the prominent tourist attractions in Kerala. More than 2,000 of these ply the waterways. The Kerala government has classified the tourist houseboats as platinum, gold, and silver.

The Kettuvallam were traditionally used as grain barges, to transport the rice harvested in the fertile fields alongside the backwaters. Thatched roof covers over wooden hulls,  in length, providing protected from the elements. At some point in time, the boats were used as living quarters by the royalty. Converted to accommodate tourists, the houseboats have become floating cottages having a sleeping area, with western-style toilets, a dining area and a sit out on the deck. Most tourists spend the night on a houseboat. Food is cooked on board by the accompanying staff—mostly having a flavour of Kerala. The houseboats are of various patterns and can be hired as per the size of the family or visiting group. The living-dining room is usually open on at least three sides providing a grand view of the surroundings, including other boats, throughout the day when it is on the move. It is brought to a standstill at times of taking food and at night. After sunset, the boat crew provide burning coils to drive away mosquitoes. Ketuvallam are motorised but generally proceed at a slow speed for smooth travel. All Ketuvallam have a generator and most bedrooms are air-conditioned. At times, as per the demand of customers, electricity is switched off and lanterns are provided to create a rural setting

Beypore has a 1,500-year tradition of boatbuilding. The skills of the local shipwrights and boatbuilders have widely sought after.

Ferry services

Regular ferry services connect most locations on both banks of the backwaters. The Kerala State Water Transport Department operates ferries for passengers as well as tourists. It is the cheapest mode of transport through the backwaters.

Resorts

Ashtamudi lake, which was a sleepy destination for years, has been transformed into a busy tourist destination with plush resorts around the Lake and the backwaters.

Impact on ecosystem 

The unregulated proliferation of motorised houseboats in the lakes and backwaters has raised concerns regarding the adverse impact of pollution from diesel engines and outboard motors on the fragile ecosystem.

Economic significance
Connected by artificial canals, the backwaters form an economical means of transport, and a large local trade is carried on by inland navigation. Fishing, along with fish curing, is an important industry.

Kerala backwaters have been used for centuries by the local people for transportation, fishing and agriculture. The region has supported the efforts of the local people to earn a livelihood. In more recent times, agricultural efforts have been strengthened with the reclamation of some backwater lands for rice growing, particularly in the Kuttanad area. Boat-making has been a traditional craft, so has been the coir industry.

Kuttanad region is crisscrossed with waterways that run alongside extensive paddy fields, as well as fields of cassava, banana and yam.  The crops are grown on the low-lying ground and irrigated with fresh water from the canal and waterways connected to Vembanad lake. Palakkad, the granary of Kerala, lies on the bank of Bharathappuzha river. Thrissur-Ponnani Kole Wetlands are fertile. Ponnani Kole Wetlands lie on the bank of Biyyam backwater. The area is similar to the dikes of the Netherlands, where land has been reclaimed from the sea and crops are grown.

Ecological significance
Vembanad Wetland is included in the list of wetlands of international importance, as defined by the Ramsar Convention for the conservation and sustainable use of wetlands.

Boat races

Traditionally these were used by local rulers to transport soldiers during waterfront wars. In modern times, it has spawned a new sport – the Vallam Kali (boat race). Each Chandan vallam accommodates about a hundred muscular oarsmen.

Boat races are occasions of great excitement and entertainment with thousands gathered on the banks to watch and cheer. Most of these races are held in the Kuttanad Region

The boat races starts with Champakulam Moolam Boat Race which is held on the Pamba River in the village Champakulam on Moolam day (according to the Malayalam Era M.E) of the Malayalam month Midhunam, the day of the installation of the deity at the Ambalappuzha Sree Krishna Temple. 

When Jawaharlal Nehru visited Kerala in 1952, four traditional Chandan valloms went to receive him. A snake boat race was organized for him. He was so impressed that when he went back to Delhi, he sent back a gleaming silver trophy for a boat race. Even today, the 1.5  km Nehru Trophy Boat Race is the most prestigious.

The Thazhathangadi boat race held every year on the Meenachil river, at Thazhathangadi, Kottayam is one of the oldest and most popular boat races in the state.

Other renowned boat races are: Indira Gandhi Boat Race, Champakulam Moolam Boat Race, Aranmula Uthrattadi Vallamkali, Payippad Jalotsavam, kallada Boat Race and Kumarakom Boat Race.

Backwater regions

Kuttanad

Important in the ancient history of South India, Kuttanadu is a region spanning the Alappuzha and Kottayam districts; it is well known for its vast paddy fields and geographical peculiarities. The region is the lowest lying of any in India and is one of the few places in the world where farming is carried around 1.2 to 3.0 metres (4 to 10 ft) below sea level. Four of Kerala's major rivers—the Pamba, Meenachil, Achankovil, and Manimala—flow into the region, and it is well known for its boat races.

Vembanad Lake, the largest lake in Kerala is at the heart of Backwater tourism, with hundreds of kettuvallams plying it and with numerous resorts on its banks. The Kumarakom Bird Sanctuary is located on the east coast of the lake.

The major occupation in Kuttanadu is farming, with rice the most important agricultural product; it is the major rice producer in the state. This activity gives the area its moniker of "The Rice Bowl of Kerala". Large farming areas near Vembanad Lake were reclaimed from the lake. In 2013, the Food and Agriculture Organization (FAO) of the United Nations formally declared the below-sea-level farming system in Kuttanad as Globally Important Agricultural Heritage Systems (GIAHS).

Kollam

Kollam (earlier known as Quilon) was one of the leading trade centres of the ancient world, eulogised by travellers such as Ibn Battuta and Marco Polo. It is also the starting point of the backwater waterways. The Ashtamudi Kayal, known as the gateway to the backwaters, covers about 30 per cent of Kollam. Sasthamcotta Kayal, the large freshwater lake is 28.5  km from Kollam city.

Islands of Kollam

Islands are the eye-catching factors as well as the beauty of Lake Ashtamudi, Kollam. Most of these islands are potential tourism spots in the state. The Indian Railways also planning to develop one of the islands in Kollam for a tourism project. There are big as well as small islands which are inhabited and uninhabited by human beings. There are more than 15 islands in Ashtamudi Lake. The important islands in Kollam are:

 Munroe Island
 Chavara Thekkumbhagom
 St. Sebastian Island
 San Thome Island
 Our Lady of Fatima Island
 Pezhumthuruth
 Kakkathuruth
 Pattamthuruth
 Paliyanthuruthu (Palliyamthuruthu)
 Neettum thuruth
 Puthenthuruth
 Poothuruth
 Pannaykkathuruth
 Veluthuruth
 Neeleswaram thuruth

Estuaries of Paravur

Paravur Estuaries lie near to the south-western coast of Kollam. The place is world-famous for its natural beauties, backwater locations, white-sand beaches and concentration of temples in every square kilometer. The peninsula of Paravur is one of the most visited in Kollam district. Both north and south tips of Paravur town have both peninsula and estuary. Pozhikara is north and Thekkumbhagam is south of Paravur. One more estuary mouth in Pozhikara, which is very close to Pozhikara Devi Temple, which has breached in 2014 under the supervision of Water Resources Department (WRD), after a long gap of 14 years.

Munroe Island

Munroethuruth or Munroe Island is a place surrounded by Kallada River, Ashtamudi Lake and Sasthamkotta Lake in Kollam district, Munroe Island is a cluster of eight tiny islands, Blessed with a number of criss-cross canals and zigzag water channels, this Island plays a host to many migratory birds from various 
countries around the world. You can watch birds such as Kingfisher, Woodpecker, Egret, Bee-eater, Crow pheasant, and Paddy Birds. There is yet another rare chance to see the traditional Indian spice plants such as Pepper, Nutmeg and Cloves.

The first community tourism programme in the State will start functioning from the MunroeThuruthu islands. Coir making is a
home industry to almost all the village living people. It is very interesting to watch the coir making by the village ladies with the help of weaving Wheels. They make the coir ropes by hand. In addition to this, on the way, you can see the process of extracting coconut oil from the "copra" [dried coconut]. Among the routine traditional engagements, duck, poultry farm and prawn breeding are common in all houses.

Thiruvananthapuram

Vellayani Lake

It is one of the freshwater lakes in Kerala. It is located in the city of Thiruvananthapuram, which is also Kerala's administrative headquarters. It is located nearer to Kovalam beach.

Thiruvallam
Thiruvallam backwaters are just 6  km from Thiruvananthapuram, the state capital. Known for its canoe rides, Thiruvallam is becoming increasingly popular with tourists. Two rivers, the Killi and the Karamana, come together at Thiruvallam. Not far from Thiruvallam is the Veli Lagoon, where there are facilities for water sports, a waterfront park and a floating bridge. The Akkulam Boat club, which offers boating cruises on Akkulam Lake and a park for children, is also a popular tourist attraction near Thiruvallam.

Wayanad

Pookode Lake

Wayanad is home to one of the state's freshwater lakes - Pookode Lake. It is also one of the 7 inland navigation backwaters in Kerala. Panamaram, the rivulet which ultimately becomes Kabani River, originates from the Pookode lake. It is spread across an area of 8.5 hectares and with a maximum depth of 6.5 metres.

Kannur
Kavvayi backwater is a stunningly beautiful backwater destination tucked away near Payyannur in the district of Kannur. Kavvayi Backwaters form the biggest wetland in north Kerala. With its five rivers, the Kavvayi River, and its tributaries- Kankol, Vannathichal, Kuppithodu, and Kuniyan – flows together to form the Kavvayi kayal.  Adorned with many small islands, a relaxing boat ride in these waters is the best way to enjoy the mesmerizing greenery of the surroundings.

Kasargod
Kasargod in north Kerala is a backwater destination, known for rice cultivation, coir processing and lovely landscape, it has the sea to the west and the Western Ghats to the north and east. Cruise options are Chandragiri and Valiyaparamba near Kavvayi Backwater. Chandragiri has situated 4  km to the southeast of Kasargod town and takes tourists to the historic Chandragiri fort. Valiyaparamba is a scenic backwater stretch near Kasargod. Four rivers flow into the backwaters near Kasargod and there are many small islands along these backwater stretches, where birds can be seen.

Kozhikode
Kozhikode (also known as Calicut) has backwaters which are largely unexplored by tourist hordes. Elathur, the Canoly Canal and the Kallayi River are favourite haunts for boating and cruising. Korapuzha, the venue of the Korapuzha Jalotsavam, is a popular water sports destination.

Malappuram
The coastal region of Malappuram contains the backwaters like Biyyam, Manoor, Veliyankode, Kodinhi, etc. Biyyam backwater which lies south of Bharathappuzha river (which is also the second longest river of Kerala) is the largest among them. Biyyam backwater and Conolly Canal together empties into Arabian Sea near Puthuponnani promontory.

Literature
Two prominent writers in the region are Thakazhi Sivasankara Pillai and Arundhati Roy.

Thakazhi Sivasankara Pillai, (1912–1999), the Padmabhusan and Jnanpith and Sahitya Akedemi award-winning writer, was born in Thakazhi village in Alappuzha district. He wrote in Malayalam. His novel Chemmeen has been translated into most Indian languages and several foreign languages.

Arundhati Roy (born 1961) was brought up in Ayemenem near Kottayam, and her Booker Prize–winning The God of Small Things is set in Kerala.

Movies
A number of movies were filmed in the backwaters around Alleppey and other parts of the state.
 Numerous Malayalam movies
Some other major movies include 
 Most scenes of Tamil movie Autograph and Kannada movie My Autograph
 Crucial scenes in Tamil movie Vinnaithaandi Varuvaayaa and its remakes in Hindi Ekk Deewana Tha, Telugu Ye Maaya Chesave
 Song "Jiya jale" and Scenes in Hindi movie Dil Se..
 Hindi movie Tashan
 Hindi film Alone
 Tamil movie Kuselan

Photo gallery

See also
 List of dams and reservoirs in Kerala
 List of mountains in Kerala
 List of rivers of Kerala

References

Notes

External links

 

Tourism in Kerala
Estuaries of India
Ramsar sites in India
Landforms of Kerala
Lagoons of India
Water transport in Kerala